Most Pure Heart of Mary Catholic Church is a Catholic church in Mobile, Alabama administered by the Josephites. The Knights of Peter Claver, the largest and oldest Black Catholic organization in the United States, was founded by congregants and priests from the parish in 1909. Its clergy and congregation later took an active role in the Civil Rights Movement.

History
Most Pure Heart of Mary Catholic Church was founded as a mission in 1899 by the Society of St. Joseph of the Sacred Heart to serve Mobile's Creoles of African descent. The first Josephite priests were Rev. Joseph St. Laurent and Rev. Louis Pastorlli.

By 1901, a small school was established that continues into the present as the Most Pure Heart of Mary School. The school was first taught by the laity, until five Sisters of St. Francis arrived from Glen Riddle, Pennsylvania in October 1902 to take over. The church building was completed in 1908 and dedicated as Most Pure Heart of Mary in honor of the Blessed Virgin Mary.

During the civil and political rights era in the United States, priests and nuns from the parish participated in boycotts and demonstrations in support of the African American community. Most Pure Heart of Mary Catholic Church served as a public meeting place for the Neighborhood Organized Workers organization. Neighborhood Organized Workers (NOW) was established in Mobile in July 1966 with a mission focused on achieving equality for the African American community.

The church is listed on the African American Heritage Trail of Mobile.

References

Roman Catholic churches in Mobile, Alabama
Neoclassical architecture in Alabama
Roman Catholic Archdiocese of Mobile
African American Heritage Trail of Mobile
American Creole
1899 establishments in Alabama
Roman Catholic churches completed in 1908
Religious organizations established in 1899
20th-century Roman Catholic church buildings in the United States
African-American history of Alabama
African-American Roman Catholic churches
Josephite churches in the United States
Knights of Peter Claver & Ladies Auxiliary
Neoclassical church buildings in the United States